Violet Brown ( Mosse; 10 March 1900 – 15 September 2017) was a Jamaican supercentenarian who was the oldest verified living person in the world for five months, following the death of Emma Morano on 15 April 2017 until her own death at the age of  on 15 September 2017. She was, along with Nabi Tajima of Japan, one of the last two living people known to have been born in the nineteenth century.

Early life 
Brown was born as Violet Mosse on 10 March 1900, and was one of four children born in Duanvale, Trelawny, British Jamaica, to John Mosse, who was a sugar boiler, and Elizabeth Riley. She was baptized at the age of 13 into the Baptist Church.

Longevity 
Brown indicated in an April 2017 interview with The Jamaica Observer that she was healthier than her five remaining children and had no ailments.

When asked about the reasons for her longevity, Brown claimed there was no secret formula to her long life, telling the Jamaica Gleaner: "Really and truly, when people ask what I eat and drink to live so long, I say to them that I eat everything, except pork and chicken, and I don't drink rum and dem tings."

She is the oldest verified Jamaican person ever and the first verified supercentenarian from Jamaica. Her date of birth was variously reported as 4 March 1900, 10 March 1900, and 15 March 1900.

Brown was born in Jamaica when it was a part of the British Empire and she was the last known subject of Queen Victoria.

Personal life 
Brown married Augustus Gaynor Brown, with whom she had one daughter. She had six children in total, four of whom were still living at the time of her death in 2017. Her first child, Harland Fairweather, died on 19 April 2017, aged . He is believed to have been the oldest person with a living parent.

Death 
Brown died on 15 September 2017 at a hospital in Montego Bay, Saint James Parish, at the age of 117, after being diagnosed with dehydration and irregular heartbeat a week prior. Following her death, Nabi Tajima became the oldest living person and the last living person born in the nineteenth century.

See also 
List of the oldest people by country
List of the verified oldest people
Oldest people

References

External links 
Violet Mosse Foundation, a nonprofit support organisation for contributing to the well-being of all elderly persons. This foundation was founded by Violet Brown's relatives and named after Violet Brown. (The site is now closed and the link is Wayback Machine)

1900 births
2017 deaths
Jamaican centenarians
Women supercentenarians
People from Trelawny Parish
Jamaican Baptists
19th-century Jamaican people
20th-century Jamaican women
20th-century Jamaican people
21st-century Jamaican women
21st-century Jamaican people
20th-century Baptists